Manta is a steel flying roller coaster at SeaWorld Orlando. Designed by Swiss firm Bolliger & Mabillard, Manta restrains riders in the prone position and features four inversions. The well-received attraction officially opened to the public on May 22, 2009. Their slogan is "Dive deep, fly high…".

History
SeaWorld Orlando revealed the concept that was to become Manta to a gathering of travel industry representatives and community leaders on April 2, 2008, although it had been in the planning stages for years. The exact specifications were not immediately revealed, but the park said it would be their largest single investment in an attraction and that it would open sometime in 2009. The park also announced that the attraction would include a roller coaster, but that it would be more than just a roller coaster. Joseph Couceirovice president of sales and marketingdescribed the ride as "the next generation SeaWorld attraction" that would immerse guests in elements of marine life.

Artists' concepts of the new attraction were leaked onto the Internet in April 2008; however, SeaWorld officials would not confirm whether the images were accurate representations of the final design, but said that the roller coaster would have a gliding sensation. At that point, construction on a large site within the park had already begun. On May 29, 2008, park officials confirmed that the attraction would be named Manta, and announced additional details about the attraction.

Construction of the roller coaster track and attraction buildings began in September 2008. Superior Rigging & Erection built the supports and track. The ride's layout was completed in December 2008 and construction on other parts of the roller coaster continued into early 2009. SeaWorld began previewing the attraction in early May 2009, before it was officially opened on May 22.

Design

Theme and surrounding experience

Manta is an attraction which encompasses a themed queue and a roller coaster. The queue is designed to resemble a seaside village decorated with mosaics and artwork inspired by rays. Within the attraction's  site are ten aquaria containing  of water. Approximately 3,000 animals representing over 60 species are visibleincluding over 300 rays, such as cownose rays and spotted eagle rays. Other creatures on display include sea horses, leafy seadragons and tropical fish.

Portions of the aquarium exhibit can be viewed by guests who do not wish to ride the roller coaster. Non-riding guests can use a second entrance to the attraction area, which is separated from those waiting for the roller coaster. Guests in the ride's queue have access to special exhibit components, such as a Plexiglas "pop-up" window into the aquarium. Mantas rails, supports and track are filled with sand to reduce noise.

Trains and loading procedure

Manta is a flying roller coaster, which simulates the sensation of flight. It is designed to resemble the way rays—mantas in particular—appear to fly through seawater. Guests are initially seated upright on the trains in one of eight rows that hold four passengers each, accommodating up to 32 riders. Manta operates with three trains. Before departure, mechanisms in the station raise the cars up to the track, such that the riders' spines are parallel to the track. Guests are secured in their seats using a locking lap bar, a vest-like harness and flaps at the riders' ankles to hold their feet in place.

The cars are highly stylized. In the original plans, the wing of the car was intended to make contact with water at a certain point of the ride, but Bolliger & Mabillard said the idea would not work and a fountain was used instead. The roller coaster's wings appear to skim the water's surface. Water jets in the attraction's main lagoon create a splash effect as the train passes. SeaWorld can adjust several features of the splash effect, including its duration and the train's speed when it enters the area. The roller coaster's color scheme includes deep purple, ultramarine blue and cobalt.

Track
There are four inversions; a pretzel loop, two inline twists and one corkscrew. The track is dark blue and the supports are light blue. Sand is placed inside some sections of track to reduce the noise produced by the trains. Friction brakes are used to control the speed of the train. The track was fabricated at the Ohio-based Clermont Steel Fabricators. In 2015, a clone of Manta opened at Nagashima Spa Land under the name of Acrobat.

Ride experience

Manta features a dual station configuration, which allows two trains to be loaded at the same time, thus increasing the ride's capacity. After departing from the station, the train will make either a slight left or right turndepending on which station it leavesinto the  chain lift hill. From the top of the lift hill, the train makes a  downward right turn into a -tall pretzel loop, after which it turns left, leading into the first of two inline twists. The train then makes a right turn followed by a slight upward left turn into a corkscrew, before turning right into the mid-course brake run. The train then drops to a point just above a body of water, at the same time making a 270-degree right turn, where water jets spray up near the train to produce the effect of the train actually hitting the water. After exiting the turn, the train goes by a waterfall, goes through the second inline twist, makes a left turn into the final brake run, then makes a left turn into one of the two stations where the next riders board.

Reception

Manta has been lauded by the mainstream media and industry press since its debut in May 2009. Busch Entertainment Corporation, SeaWorld Orlando's parent company, credited Manta with improving park attendance. In July 2009, ThemeParkInsider.com named Manta "best new attraction". In September 2009, Manta placed third in Amusement Today magazine's poll for the Best New Ride of 2009.

See also
Manta (SeaWorld San Diego)
Texas Stingray (SeaWorld San Antonio)

References

External links
 Official Manta website

SeaWorld Orlando
Roller coasters introduced in 2009
Roller coasters operated by SeaWorld Parks & Entertainment
2009 establishments in Florida
Roller coasters in Florida
Flying roller coasters manufactured by Bolliger & Mabillard